Franklin Mitchell (October 1, 1824 – May 11, 1911) was a member of the Wisconsin State Assembly.

Biography
Mitchell was born on October 1, 1824 in Fayette County, Pennsylvania. He later resided in Spring Grove, Wisconsin. He died in Los Angeles in 1911.

Career
Mitchell was a member of the Assembly during the 1877, 1878, and 1879 sessions. Additionally, he was a member of the Town Board (similar to city council) of Spring Grove. He was a Republican.

References

External links
 

People from Fayette County, Pennsylvania
People from Spring Grove, Wisconsin
Republican Party members of the Wisconsin State Assembly
Wisconsin city council members
1824 births
1911 deaths